Michel Rougerie (21 April 1950 in Montreuil-sous-Bois - 31 May 1981 in Rijeka) was a French professional motorcycle racer. He competed in the Grand Prix road racing world championships from 1972 to 1981.

His best year was in 1975 when he won two races and finished in second place in the 250cc world championship behind his Harley-Davidson team-mate Walter Villa. Rougerie actually scored more points than Villa that season, but because only the best six results of the season were counted, he lost the championship.

He was killed in 1981 because he was hit by another racer while competing at the Yugoslavian Grand Prix.

Grand Prix motorcycle racing results

Points system from 1969 onwards:

(key) (Races in bold indicate pole position; races in italics indicate fastest lap)

References

1950 births
1981 deaths
Sportspeople from Montreuil, Seine-Saint-Denis
French motorcycle racers
125cc World Championship riders
250cc World Championship riders
350cc World Championship riders
500cc World Championship riders
Motorcycle racers who died while racing
Sport deaths in Yugoslavia